John Joseph McGowan (born October 3, 1962) is a musician and author, most famous for his work as one of the lead singers of the Cro-Mags. He is currently the vocalist of Bloodclot. He is a triathlete competitor, he writes about his "positive mental attitude" and vegan lifestyle, and he is known for his anti-vaccine stance against mandatory vaccine policy requirements.

Early life
McGowan was raised in foster care, and grew up on the streets of New York City.

Career
McGowan joined the New York City hardcore punk band Cro-Mags as the lead singer in 1981 for six months until the band broke up, and again from 1984 until 1987, taking over on vocals from Eric Casanova. He sang on a demo and wrote lyrics on the band's first, third, and fourth albums (The Age of Quarrel, Alpha Omega, and Near Death Experience). He also sings lead on the Before the Quarrel CD, essentially a reissue of the demo.

Before, during, and after his time in the Cro-Mags, McGowan served as a roadie for Bad Brains, and he sang background vocals on Antidote's Thou Shalt Not Kill EP. He returned to the Cro-Mags briefly in the 1990s.

He also worked as a bicycle messenger in New York City from 1981 to 1991, and continues to cycle around the city today, often recording it for his social media in his Bad Brains onesie.

McGowan has also sung for the bands Both Worlds and Bloodclot. His autobiography, The Evolution of a Cro-Magnon, published in 2007, details the major events in his life, including his extensive involvement with the hare krishnas, as well his experiences with the Cro-Mags and Bad Brains.

Interviews with McGowan were featured in the 1999 documentary N.Y.H.C. as well as the 2006 documentary American Hardcore. He has also done some voice acting, playing the Bad Brains loving hippo in the cartoon Three Thug Mice. Since 2010, McGowan started competing in Ironman competitions.

Published works

McGowan authored "Evolution of a Cro-Magnon" in 2007 which details his upbringing in an abusive foster home, early days on "The Deuce" in NYC, meeting Bad Brains and his misadventures with the Cro-Mags. McGowan is also the author of the book Meat Is for Pussies (2010), which covers vegan nutrition, training, Bad Brains and a healthy lifestyle. In 2018 he released a book titled The P.M.A. Effect on the idea of positive mental attitude made popular by the punk band Bad Brains.

Personal life
McGowan follows a plant-based diet. He was a vegan prior to becoming plant-based. He  lives a straight edge lifestyle, but does not identify with its subculture.

McGowan was criticized in 2021 for his anti-vaccine stance on COVID-19 after he played a Bloodclot gig in April 2021 with no safety protocols in place against the spread of the virus. He said that the US vaccine program was "government overreach". He lashed out against Dave Grohl for scheduling shows in July 2021 intended only for audience members with proof of vaccination. Later that year, he caught the Omicron variant without having been vaccinated at all, and he said he got through it without a problem because of his healthy lifestyle.

References

External links
Bloodclot! on Myspace (Official Bloodclot! MySpace page)
John Joseph on Instagram
HARD TRUTH, John Joseph's vegan cooking channel on YouTube

American punk rock singers
1962 births
Living people
Place of birth missing (living people)
American Hare Krishnas
Singers from New York City
20th-century American singers
21st-century American singers
American male triathletes
Cro-Mags members